Moon Sung-wook (Korean: 문승욱, born 1965) is a South Korean government official served as Minister of Trade, Industry and Energy from 2021 to 2022. He previously served as the 2nd Deputy Minister for Government Policy Coordination from 2020 to 2021, the Deputy Governor of South Gyeongsang from 2018 to 2020, and the Deputy Minister of Defence Acquisition Programme Administration from 2016 to 2017.

Career 
His career has begun after qualifying for the Public Administration Examination in 1989. He used to work together with Kim Kyoung-soo at the Blue House under the former President Roh Moo-hyun. He served various positions at the Ministry of Knowledge Economy, and then the Ministry of Trade, Industry and Energy from 2008 to 2018.

Moon was appointed the Deputy Minister of Defence Acquisition Programme Administration during the Park Geun-hye government in February 2016. He remained at the position after Moon Jae-in was elected the President in 2017, until he was replaced by Yoo Jung-yeol in October 2017.

After Kim Kyoung-soo was elected the Governor of South Gyeongsang in the 2018 local elections, Moon was nominated the Deputy Governor for Economy in July 2018. He served for about 2 years until he was appointed the 2nd Deputy Minister for Government Policy Coordination on 8 May 2020.

On 16 April 2021, President Moon Jae-in was nominated the new Minister of Trade, Industry and Energy.

Education 
Moon attended Sungdong High School before entering to Yonsei University to study Bachelor in Economics. He is also graduated from Master in Public Administration at Seoul National University and Harvard University.

Notes

References 

1965 births
Living people
Industry ministers
Energy ministers
Yonsei University alumni
Seoul National University alumni
Harvard University alumni
South Korean government officials